Inge Birgit Anker Hansen is a former Danish badminton player. With her mixed doubles partners Finn Kobberø and Poul-Erik Nielsen she won the National title in 1954, 1959 & 1961. In addition Inge won the women's doubles in 1956 & 1960 with Aase Winther. 
Her greatest success came during the 1959 All England Badminton Championships when she won the mixed doubles with Nielsen.

Medal Record at the All England Badminton Championships

References

Danish female badminton players